Barbacoas is a city in the state of Aragua, Venezuela. It is the shire town of the Urdaneta Municipality.

It was founded, in 1712, with the name San Andrés de Aricapano de Barbacoas, and during the eighteenth century was known as "Partido de Aricapano".

Populated places in Aragua